Maceo is a town and municipality in the Colombian department of Antioquia.

Municipalities of Antioquia Department